The Staffordshire Intermediate Cup is an annual rugby union knock-out club competition organized by the Staffordshire Rugby Union.  It was first introduced during the 2001-02 season, with the inaugural winners being Burntwood.  It is the second most important rugby union cup competition in Staffordshire, behind the Staffordshire Senior Cup but ahead of the Staffordshire Owen Cup.

The Intermediate Cup is open to club sides based in Staffordshire and parts of the West Midlands typically playing in tier 7 (Midlands 2 West (North)) and tier 8 (Midlands 3 West (North)) of the English rugby union system.  The current format is a knock-out competition with a first round, semi finals and a final played at a neutral ground in April-May.  At present Intermediate Cup finals are held on the same date and at the same venue as the Owen Cup finals.

Staffordshire Intermediate Cup winners

Number of wins
Willenhall (4)
Burntwood (3)
Newcastle (Staffs) (3)
Wednesbury (3)
Tamworth (2)
Eccleshall (1)
Handsworth (1)
Will Peach (0)

See also
 Staffordshire RU
 Staffordshire Senior Cup
 Staffordshire Owen Cup
 English rugby union system
 Rugby union in England

References

External links
 Staffordshire RU

Recurring sporting events established in 2001
2001 establishments in England
Rugby union cup competitions in England
Rugby union in Staffordshire
Sport in Staffordshire